Speed Limited is a 1935 American crime film directed by Albert Herman and starring Evelyn Brent. It was made by the low-budget Poverty Row company Regent Pictures

Cast 
 Ralph Graves as Jerry Paley
 Evelyn Brent as Natalie
 Claudia Dell as Marjorie
 Andy Rice as Smitty
 Walter Worden as Government man
 Vance Carroll as Tommy
 Gordon Griffith as Government man
 Fred 'Snowflake' Toones as First Pullman Porter, Vegas train station

References

External links 

1935 films
1935 crime films
American crime films
American black-and-white films
Films set in the Las Vegas Valley
Films directed by Albert Herman
1930s English-language films
1930s American films